Cydistomyia is a genus of horse flies in the family Tabanidae.

Species
Cydistomyia abava Philip, 1959
Cydistomyia aberrans Philip, 1970
Cydistomyia absol Philip, 1959
Cydistomyia albidosegmentata (Schuurmans Stekhoven, 1926)
Cydistomyia albithorax (Ricardo, 1913)
Cydistomyia amblychroma (Speiser, 1910)
Cydistomyia angusta (Oldroyd, 1954)
Cydistomyia assamensis Philip, 1970
Cydistomyia atmophora (Taylor, 1919)
Cydistomyia atra (Oldroyd, 1954)
Cydistomyia atrata Burger, 1995
Cydistomyia atrostriatus Burger, 2006
Cydistomyia avida (Bigot, 1892)
Cydistomyia bancroftae Mackerras, 1964
Cydistomyia barretti Mackerras, 1964
Cydistomyia bezzii Mackerras & Rageau, 1958
Cydistomyia bisecta Oldroyd, 1949
Cydistomyia brachypalpus Trojan, 1991
Cydistomyia brevior (Walker, 1848)
Cydistomyia brunnea Burger, 1982
Cydistomyia bugnicourti Mackerras & Rageau, 1958
Cydistomyia caledonica (Ricardo, 1914)
Cydistomyia casuarinae (English, Mackerras & Dyce, 1958)
Cydistomyia celebensis (Schuurmans Stekhoven, 1932)
Cydistomyia ceylonica (Ricardo, 1911)
Cydistomyia chaineyi Daniels, 1989
Cydistomyia choiseulensis Burger, 1991
Cydistomyia cohici Mackerras & Rageau, 1958
Cydistomyia colasbelcouri Mackerras & Rageau, 1958
Cydistomyia cooksoni Usher, 1965
Cydistomyia crepuscularis Oldroyd, 1949
Cydistomyia curvabilis Mackerras & Spratt, 2008
Cydistomyia cyanea (Wiedemann, 1828)
Cydistomyia danielsorum Mackerras & Spratt, 2008
Cydistomyia danutae Trojan, 1991
Cydistomyia delicata Philip, 1980
Cydistomyia diasi Mackerras & Rageau, 1958
Cydistomyia doddi (Taylor, 1917)
Cydistomyia duplonotata (Ricardo, 1914)
Cydistomyia emergens (Oldroyd, 1957)
Cydistomyia erythrocephala (Wulp, 1869)
Cydistomyia exemplum Mackerras & Spratt, 2008
Cydistomyia fenestra Mackerras & Spratt, 2008
Cydistomyia fergusoni Mackerras & Spratt, 2008
Cydistomyia fijiensis Burger, 2006
Cydistomyia frontalis Philip, 1959
Cydistomyia furcata (Oldroyd, 1954)
Cydistomyia grayi (Oldroyd, 1957)
Cydistomyia griseicolor (Ferguson & Hill, 1922)
Cydistomyia griseiventer (Schuurmans Stekhoven, 1926)
Cydistomyia hardyi Mackerras & Spratt, 2008
Cydistomyia heydoni Oldroyd, 1949
Cydistomyia hollandiensis Mackerras, 1964
Cydistomyia hyperythrea (Bigot, 1892)
Cydistomyia ignota Usher, 1965
Cydistomyia imbecilla (Karsch, 1888)
Cydistomyia imitans Oldroyd, 1949
Cydistomyia immatura Oldroyd, 1949
Cydistomyia immigrans Oldroyd, 1949
Cydistomyia improcerus Mackerras & Spratt, 2008
Cydistomyia indiana Philip, 1970
Cydistomyia infirmus Mackerras & Spratt, 2008
Cydistomyia ingridina Usher, 1965
Cydistomyia innubilus Mackerras & Spratt, 2008
Cydistomyia inopinata Oldroyd, 1949
Cydistomyia insurgens (Walker, 1861)
Cydistomyia jactum Oldroyd, 1949
Cydistomyia kamialiensis Goodwin, 1999
Cydistomyia koroyanituensis Burger, 2006
Cydistomyia kraussi Burger, 1995
Cydistomyia laeta (Meijere, 1906)
Cydistomyia lamellata Oldroyd, 1949
Cydistomyia laticallosa (Ricardo, 1914)
Cydistomyia latisegmentata (Schuurmans Stekhoven, 1926)
Cydistomyia latistriata (Schuurmans Stekhoven, 1926)
Cydistomyia lifuensis (Bigot, 1892)
Cydistomyia limbatella (Bezzi, 1928)
Cydistomyia longicornis Burger, 1995
Cydistomyia longipennis Burger, 1995
Cydistomyia longirostris (Schuurmans Stekhoven, 1926)
Cydistomyia longistyla Burger, 1995
Cydistomyia lorentzi (Ricardo, 1913)
Cydistomyia macmilani Mackerras, 1964
Cydistomyia magnetica (Ferguson & Hill, 1922)
Cydistomyia major Oldroyd, 1964
Cydistomyia massali Mackerras & Rageau, 1958
Cydistomyia matilei Trojan, 1991
Cydistomyia medialis (Oldroyd, 1954)
Cydistomyia metallica Burger, 1995
Cydistomyia minor (Oldroyd, 1954)
Cydistomyia minor (Oldroyd, 1957)
Cydistomyia minuta Burger, 1995
Cydistomyia misol Philip, 1959
Cydistomyia monteithi Mackerras & Spratt, 2008
Cydistomyia mouchai Philip, 1970
Cydistomyia musgravii (Taylor, 1918)
Cydistomyia nana (Wiedemann, 1821)
Cydistomyia nannoides Mackerras, 1971
Cydistomyia nigrina Mackerras, 1971
Cydistomyia nigropicta (Macquart, 1855)
Cydistomyia nokensis Oldroyd, 1949
Cydistomyia norae Trojan, 1991
Cydistomyia obscurus Mackerras & Spratt, 2008
Cydistomyia oldroydi Mackerras, 1964
Cydistomyia pacifica (Ricardo, 1917)
Cydistomyia palmensis (Ferguson & Hill, 1922)
Cydistomyia papouina (Walker, 1865)
Cydistomyia parapacifica Mackerras, 1971
Cydistomyia parasol Philip, 1959
Cydistomyia perdita Mackerras, 1964
Cydistomyia philipi Burger, 1982
Cydistomyia pilipennis Burger, 1982
Cydistomyia pilosus Mackerras & Spratt, 2008
Cydistomyia pinensis Burger, 1995
Cydistomyia platybasiannulata (Schuurmans Stekhoven, 1926)
Cydistomyia polyzona (Szilády, 1926)
Cydistomyia pondo (Oldroyd, 1954)
Cydistomyia primitiva Mackerras, 1962
Cydistomyia pruina Mackerras & Spratt, 2008
Cydistomyia pseudimmatura Oldroyd, 1949
Cydistomyia pseudoardens (Taylor, 1913)
Cydistomyia pseudobrevior Mackerras & Spratt, 2008
Cydistomyia quadrimaculata Burger, 1995
Cydistomyia quasimmatura Mackerras, 1964
Cydistomyia risbeci Mackerras & Rageau, 1958
Cydistomyia rivularis (Ferguson & Hill, 1922)
Cydistomyia rosselensis Mackerras, 1971
Cydistomyia roubaudi Mackerras & Rageau, 1958
Cydistomyia sabulosus Mackerras & Spratt, 2008
Cydistomyia secunda Mackerras, 1962
Cydistomyia shaka Usher, 1970
Cydistomyia silviformis (Taylor, 1919)
Cydistomyia similis Mackerras, 1964
Cydistomyia sol (Schuurmans Stekhoven, 1926)
Cydistomyia solomensis (Ricardo, 1915)
Cydistomyia sulcipalpus (Loew, 1858)
Cydistomyia sylvioides (Walker, 1864)
Cydistomyia tasmaniensis Mackerras & Spratt, 2008
Cydistomyia teloides Mackerras, 1971
Cydistomyia tibialis Burger, 1982
Cydistomyia tiwackai Trojan, 1991
Cydistomyia torresi (Ferguson & Hill, 1922)
Cydistomyia toumanoffi Mackerras & Rageau, 1958
Cydistomyia triangularis Mackerras & Spratt, 2008
Cydistomyia victoriensis (Ricardo, 1915)
Cydistomyia wentworthi (Ferguson & Hill, 1922)
Cydistomyia zimbiti Usher, 1970

References

Tabanidae
Diptera of Australasia
Diptera of Asia
Diptera of Africa
Brachycera genera